Natalia Luis-Bassa (born 13 July 1966, Caracas, Venezuela) is a Venezuelan conductor who lives and works in England, where she is Professor of Conducting at the Royal College of Music and Principal Guest Conductor of Oxford University Orchestra.

Background
Since winning the second prize at the Maazel-Vilar Conductor's Competition in New York City, she has worked both in the United Kingdom and abroad with orchestras including the Orquesta Sinfónica Venezuela, Scottish Chamber Orchestra, Paragon Ensemble, Bombay Chamber Orchestra, Huddersfield Philharmonic Orchestra, Haffner Orchestra, Filamónica Nacional, Royal Oman Symphony Orchestra, the Simón Bolívar Youth Orchestra of Venezuela, Southbank Sinfonia and the National Children's Orchestra of Great Britain

Natalia studied Oboe with Lido Guarnieri.

She was the first female to receive a degree in Orchestral Conducting in her native country to read music at the University Institute of Musical Studies (IUDEM).

She was appointed music director of the Orquesta Sinfónica de Falcón and after some years she completed her studies at the Royal College of Music in London, holding the RCM Junior Fellowship in Opera Conducting for two years.

Natalia holds a master's degree from The University of Huddersfield where she is a part-time lecturer and has been appointed Elgar Ambassador.

In August 2008 Luis-Bassa appeared in the reality TV talent show-themed television series, Maestro on BBC Two, as a mentor to David Soul.

The Royal College of Music has appointed Natalia as a Professor of Conducting alongside Maestro Peter Stark.

Natalia also works with the National Children's Orchestra of Great Britain, conducting the London Regionals and runs the Conductor's Course. She also conducted the Main Orchestra playing Danzon No. 2 by Arturo Márquez in the Summer Concert of 2011, and again playing Sibelius Symphony 2 in 2014. She is renowned among the NCO for her flamboyant conducting.

Personal life
Her father, Germinal, was born in Barcelona, Spain. As a child, during the Spanish Civil War, he had to escape from Barcelona and went to France, the United States, Argentina and finally Venezuela where he married Lillian, a Venezuelan whose parents were Spanish. Both of them were opera and zarzuela lovers.

She is a graduate of the Royal College of Music in London.

She grew up in a house full of music with her two sisters. Luis-Bassa now lives in West Yorkshire, the "Last of the Summer Wine" county.

References

External links
 Natalia Luis-Bassa's website

1966 births
Living people
Venezuelan conductors (music)
Venezuelan classical musicians
People from Caracas
Alumni of the Royal College of Music
Women conductors (music)
21st-century conductors (music)